Etah railway station is on the Barhan–Etah branch line. It is located in Etah district in the Indian state of Uttar Pradesh. It serves Etah and the surrounding areas.

History 
Trains started running on the Howrah–Delhi main line of East Indian Railway Company in 1865–66.
After independence, Etah railway station was established in 1949 by the State Railways minister Mr. Rohanlal Chaturvedi!  Etah railway station was inaugurated by the first President of India Dr Rajendra Prasad.  After this time passed but the railway resources remained there.  From 2000 onwards, the demand for railway line expansion started gaining momentum, which became the major demand of every section since 2005.  All the movements took place from Etah to the capital Delhi.  How many memoranda and signatures have been sent to the President Prime Minister and the Ministry of Railways, but till now the railway line expansion remains the hope.

Train 
Etah - Tundla passenger train started.  Which used to take two rounds daily.  After that, for the first time in 2019, the Etah-Agra Fort train ran.  Which was closed after just 6 months.  The Etah-Tundla passenger was also discontinued at Lockdon.  But now this train has started in 2021 again.  It is a matter of happiness that Etah - Agra Fort has also started running again. But sadly, despite Etah being a district, the station here is small with not many trains  available.  Only two trains run.  There are no long distance trains.

Development 
Etah–Kasganj new line work has been sanctioned in the Budget 2017–2018.

New passenger train service started from Etah to Agra Fort railway station.

Work is underway on the new railway line between Etah to Malawan for the ultra mega power plant being built in Etah.

A New route has been surveyed from Etah to Aligarh and there is a demand for connecting it to Mainpuri and Gursahaiganj(kannuj).

Work is also underway to electrify the track on Barhan–Etah line.

Work is currently underway at its station to make Etah a big junction and to increase the number of train and freight train.the goal is to connect Etah to Dedicated Freight Corridor.

The railway is now going to make Etah railway station a hub for goods trains.  So far, only one track has been laid from Barhan to Agra.  Its electrification work is on the verge of ending.  At the same time, a new track will be laid to erect goods trains on the south side of the railway station.  Two tracks will be laid here, so that freight trains can be easily erected.  At the same time, the length of the platform will be increased and the signals will be repaired.

See also 
Jaleswar railway station
Barhan Junction railway station
Tundla Junction railway station
Agra Fort railway station
Hathras Junction railway station
Aligarh Junction railway station
Mainpuri railway station
Etawah Junction railway station
Agra Cantonment railway station
Mathura Junction railway station
New Delhi railway station
Kanpur Central railway station

References 

Railway stations in Etah district
Allahabad railway division
1865 establishments in India
Etah